The Communist Correspondence Committee (German: Kommunistisches Korrespondenz-Komitee) was an association of communists founded by Karl Marx and Friedrich Engels with committees in Brussels, London, Cologne and Paris with the aim of politically and ideologically organising socialists of different countries to form a revolutionary proletarian party.

History 
The first committee was formed in Brussels which became the headquarters of the Correspondence Committee, with members including Karl Marx, Wilhelm Wolff, Joseph Weydemeyer, Edgar von Westphalen, Ferdinand Wolff and Philip Giot.

Another committee was formed in London between May and June 1846, formed by Joseph Maximilian Moll and Karl Schapper, among others. In June 1846, the Wuppertal communist Gustav Adolf Koettgen approached the Brussels committee and suggested that the German communists should inform each other of their actions, which the Committee welcomed.

Engels, who went to France in 1846 upon the committee’s assignment, led the struggle against Pierre-Joseph Proudhon's reformist influence, the “true socialism,” of Karl Grün and "Weitlingism" or better known as the levelling communism of Wilhelm Weitling among Paris workers. In August 1846, Engels formed the Paris Committee there, on behalf of the Brussels Committee, to disseminate the ideas of the committees under the League of the Just.

From 1846 to 1847, Heinrich Bürgers and Roland Daniels worked in Cologne for the Correspondence Committee and the physician Georg Weber in Kiel. The traveling salesman and poet Georg Weerth also worked as a courier for the committees.

At the London conference in 1847, at which the League of Communists was formed, for which Marx and Engles later wrote the Communist Manifesto, all of the committees were present, for Paris Engels and for Brussels Wolff.

Bibliography 

 Karl Obermann: Zur Geschichte des Kommunistischen Korrespondenzkomitees im Jahre 1846, insbesondere im Rheinland und in Westfalen. In: Beiträge zur Geschichte der deutschen Arbeiterbewegung. Berlin 1962, Sonderheft, S. 116 ff.
 Walter Schmidt: Wilhelm Wolff als Mitglied des Kommunistischen Korrespondenzkomitees 1846. In: Beiträge zur Geschichte der Arbeiterbewegung. Berlin 1964, Heft 3, S. 443 ff.
 Herwig Förder, Martin Hundt, Jefim Kandel, Sofia Lewiowa (Hrsg.): Bund der Kommunisten. Dokumente und Materialien, Band 1: 1836–1849. Dietz Verlag, Berlin 1970, S. 322–446.
 Herwig Förder: Marx und Engels am Vorabend der Revolution. Akademie Verlag, Berlin 1960, S. 52–74. Kapitel: „Die Auseinandersetzung mit Weitling (30. März 1846)“, „Das ‚Zirkular gegen Kriege‘ (11. Mai 1846“)
 David Rjazanov: Marx und Engels – nicht nur für AnfängerInnen. Rotbuch Verlag, Berlin 1973, S. 57–61. ISBN 3-88022-005-0 Lesen (englisch).
 Walter Schmidt: Zur Kontroverse um den New-Yorker „Volks-Tribun“ von Mai bis Oktober 1846. In: Zentralinstitut für Philosophie (Hrsg.): Alternativen denken. Berlin 1991, S. 62–71.

References 

Marxism
1846 establishments in England
1847 disestablishments in England
Left-wing internationals
Communist organizations in Europe